was a Japanese film director, animator, screenwriter and manga artist from Sapporo, Hokkaido and a member of the Japanese Animation Creators Association (JAniCA). He was a graduate of the Graphic Design department of the Musashino Art University. He is best known for his acclaimed anime films Perfect Blue (1997), Millennium Actress (2001), Tokyo Godfathers (2003), and Paprika (2006).
He died of pancreatic cancer at the age of 46 on August 24, 2010.

Biography

Early life
Satoshi Kon was born on October 12, 1963. Due to his father's job transfer, Kon's education from the fourth elementary grade up to the second middle-school grade was based in Sapporo. Kon was a classmate and close friend of manga artist Seihō Takizawa. While attending Hokkaido Kushiro Koryo High School, Kon aspired to become an animator. Kon entered the Graphic Design course of the Musashino Art University in 1982.

Early career
While in college, Kon made his debut as a manga artist with the short manga Toriko (1984) and earned a runner-up spot in the 10th Annual Tetsuya Chiba Awards held by Young Magazine (Kodansha). Afterward, he found work as Katsuhiro Otomo's assistant. After graduating from college in 1987, Kon authored the single-volume manga Kaikisen (1990) and wrote the script for Otomo's live-action film World Apartment Horror.

In 1991, Kon worked in anime for the first time as an animator and on background design for the film Roujin Z, which was written by Otomo.

He began working around 1992 as a scriptwriter, layout artist and background designer for Magnetic Rose (directed by Koji Morimoto), one of three short films in Katsuhiro Otomo's omnibus Memories (released in 1995). This was the first time he adopted the theme of "the fusion of fantasy and reality" as the theme of his work.

Kon worked as one of five layout artists on Mamoru Oshii's Patlabor 2: The Movie in 1993, along with other animated films. He made his directorial debut with episode 5 of the 1993–1994 OVA JoJo's Bizarre Adventure, which he also wrote the script and storyboarded.

Kon then worked with Mamoru Oshii on the manga Seraphim: Wings of 266,613,336, which was written by Oshii and drawn by Kon. The manga was serialized in the monthly anime magazine Animage starting in 1994. However, as the series progressed, the opinions of Kon and Oshii became divided, and the series went on hiatus and ended unfinished. After this work, Kon ended his career as a manga artist and devoted himself to making anime.

Directing
In 1997, Kon began work on his directorial debut Perfect Blue (based on Yoshikazu Takeuchi's novel of the same name). It was the first film by Kon to be produced by Madhouse, and producer Masao Maruyama invited him because he liked the episode Kon directed in JoJo's Bizarre Adventure. A suspense story centered on a pop idol and Kon was initially unsatisfied with the first script based on the original and requested to make changes to it. With the permission of the original author, Yoshikazu Takeuchi, Kon was allowed to make any changes he wanted, except for keeping the three elements of the novel ("idol," "horror" and "stalker"). The screenplay was written by Sadayuki Murai, who worked in the idea of a blurred border between the real world and imagination.

Following Perfect Blue, Kon considered adapting the 1993 Yasutaka Tsutsui novel Paprika into his next film. However, these plans were stalled when the distribution company for Perfect Blue (Rex Entertainment) went bankrupt. Coincidentally, Kon's next work would also feature a film studio going bankrupt.

In 2002, Kon's second film, Millennium Actress, was released to the public. The distribution company for the North American release was DreamWorks-affiliated Go Fish Pictures. The film centers on a retired actress who mysteriously withdraws from the public eye at the peak of her career. Having the same estimated budget as Perfect Blue (approximately 120 million yen), Millennium Actress garnered higher critical and financial success than its predecessor and earned numerous awards. The screenplay was written by Sadayuki Murai, who utilized a seamless connection between illusion and reality to create a "Trompe-l'œil kind of film". Millennium Actress was the first Satoshi Kon film to feature Susumu Hirasawa, of whom Kon was a long-time fan, as composer.

In 2003, Kon's third work, Tokyo Godfathers, was announced. The distribution company for the North American release was Sony Pictures-affiliated Destination Films. The film centers on a trio of homeless persons in Tokyo who discover a baby on Christmas Eve and set out to search for her parents. Tokyo Godfathers cost more to make than Kon's previous two films (with a budget of approximately 300 million yen), and centered on the themes of homelessness and abandonment, with a comedic touch worked in. The screenplay was written by Keiko Nobumoto. This work also marked the transition from celluloid animation to digital animation.

In 2004, Kon released the 13-episode television series Paranoia Agent, in which Kon revisits the theme of the blending of imagination and reality, as well as working in additional social themes. The series was created from an abundance of unused ideas for stories and arrangements that Kon felt were good but did not fit into any of his projects.

In 2006, Paprika was announced, after having been planned out and materializing for several years. The story centers on a new form of psychotherapy that utilizes dream analysis to treat mental patients. The film was highly successful and earned a number of film awards. Kon summed up the film with —roughly, "Everything but the fundamental story was changed." Much like Kon's previous works, the film focuses on the synergy of dreams and reality.

He participated in the TV program Ani*Kuri15 broadcast by NHK in 2007. His one-minute short film Ohayō was aired along with works by Mamoru Oshii, Makoto Shinkai and others. That same year, Kon helped establish and served as a member of the Japanese Animation Creators Association (JAniCA).

Health deterioration and death
Following Ohayō, Kon began work on his next film, Dreaming Machine. In May 2010, Kon was diagnosed with terminal pancreatic cancer. Given half a year to live, Kon chose to spend the remainder of his life in his home. Shortly before his death Kon composed a final message, which was uploaded to his blog by his family upon his death. As Kon explained in the message, he chose not to make news of his rapidly advancing illness public, in part out of embarrassment at how drastically emaciated and ravaged his body had become. The result was that the announcement of his death was met with widespread shock and surprise, particularly given that Kon had shown no signs of illness at relatively recent public events, as the cancer progressed to a terminal state in a matter of months after being diagnosed. Kon died on August 24, 2010, at the age of 46. After his death, Kon was mentioned among the Fond Farewells in Times people of the year 2010.

Dreaming Machine
In November 2010, Madhouse, the animation studio that had previously produced Kon's works, officially announced that they would continue to produce the unfinished "Yumemiru Kikai", and that the animation director Yoshimi Itazu would be acting as the director. However, the project was halted in 2011 due to financial reasons. As of 2013, the completion of Dreaming Machine remains uncertain due to funding difficulties, with only 600 of the 1,500 shots being animated.

At Otakon 2012, Madhouse founder Masao Maruyama, who was involved in all of Kon's films from Perfect Blue to Paprika and was also his friend and collaborator, stated: "Unfortunately, we still don't have enough money. My personal goal is to get it within five years after his passing. I'm still working hard towards that goal."

In July 2015, Madhouse reported that Dreaming Machine remains in production but they are looking for a director to match Kon's abilities and similar vision.

In August 2016, Mappa Producer Masao Maruyama Said in an interview: "For 4~5 years, I kept searching for a suitable director to complete Kon's work. Before his death, the storyboard and script, even part of the keyframe film was already completed. Then I thought, even if someone can mimic Kon's work, it would still be clear that it's only an imitation. For example, if Mamoru Hosoda took the director's position, the completed Dreaming Machine would still be a good piece of work. However, that would make it Hosoda's movie, not Kon's. Dreaming Machine should be Kon's movie, him and only him, not someone else's. That means we cannot and should not "compromise" only to finish it. I spent years to finally reach this hard conclusion. Instead, we should take only Kon's "original concept", and let somebody turn it into a feature film. By doing so, the completed piece could 100% be that person's work, and I'm OK with that. I also considered about doing a documentary of Kon."

However, Maruyama has not completely given up on the production. He says, "If a talented director from overseas is willing to take on the project, it is not entirely without possibility," suggesting that the project is not entirely without a chance of restarting.

Themes
The theme of "mixture of fiction and reality" is a keyword that symbolizes Kon Satoshi's works, and he repeatedly depicts the relationship between "fiction and reality" with various approaches in each of his works. In Perfect Blue, Millennium Actress and Paprika, the boundary between fiction and reality gradually became blurred, and the characters were portrayed as going back and forth between fiction and reality. At first glance, Tokyo Godfathers does not seem to deal with the motif of "fiction and reality," but it does have a device in which the "fiction" of "miracles and coincidences" is successively introduced into the realistic life of homeless people in Tokyo. Because of the character designs and the way they are expressed, Kon's works seem to be aiming for realism. However, Kon's goal is not to "depict landscapes and people that look as if they are real" but to "depict the moment when landscapes and people that look as if they are real suddenly reveal themselves to be 'fiction' or 'pictures'. His ability to depict a realistic world, which he has demonstrated in order in the films he has participated in as a staff member, such as Otomo's and Oshii's works, is utilized in his own works to most effectively show the drop of "transition from reality to fiction". The world that appears to be real in Kon's works does not remain real, but is suddenly transformed into an unfamiliar world in order to disorient the audience. This is the reason why he insisted on animated films instead of live action.

When asked about his interest in female characters, Kon stated that female characters were easier to write because he is not able to know the character in the same way as a male character, and "can project my obsession onto the characters and expand the aspects I want to describe." With a frame of reference up to Tokyo Godfathers, Susan J. Napier notes that while the theme of performance is the one obvious commonality in his works, she finds that the concept of the male gaze is the more important topic for discussion. Napier shows the evolution of Kon's use of the gaze from its restrictive and negative aspects in Magnetic Rose and Perfect Blue, to a collaborative gaze in Millennium Actress before arriving at a new type of gaze in Tokyo Godfathers which revels in uncertainty and illusion.

Dean DeBlois said, "Satoshi Kon used the hand-drawn medium to explore social stigmas and the human psyche, casting a light on our complexities in ways that might have failed in live action. Much of it was gritty, intense and, at times, even nightmarish. Kon didn't shy away from mature subject matter or live-action sensibilities in his work, and his films will always occupy a fascinating middle ground between 'cartoons' and the world as we know it."

Influences
Kon stated in 2007 that the music of Susumu Hirasawa had been the greatest influence on his expressive style.
Kon said that he has learned a lot from Hirasawa's attitude towards music and production, and that he owes a lot of the stories and concepts he creates to his influence. Kon's idea of fractal control of film comes from Susumu Hirasawa, who has applied fractal-generating programs to music production. Hirasawa's lyrics sparked Kon's interest in Jungian psychology and the writings of Hayao Kawai, Japan's foremost expert on Jungian psychology, who has psychologically deciphered ancient myths and folktales, which greatly influenced his storytelling and direction. All of Kon's works, from Perfect Blue to the suspended Dreaming Machine, have been inspired by Hirasawa's lyrics and songs. Susumu Hirasawa's "Rotation (LOTUS-2)", which is the theme song of Millennium Actress, was played at Kon's funeral.

Kon says that he is influenced by everything he has been exposed to in his life, including writing, painting, music, film, manga, anime, television and theater. He has learned a lot from Osamu Tezuka and Katsuhiro Otomo in manga, Hayao Miyazaki in animation, Akira Kurosawa and many other great Japanese and international directors in film.

He was familiarized with Tezuka's manga and animation works such as Astro Boy, The Jungle Emperor and Princess Knight in his childhood.

He was an avid watcher of anime titles, such as Space Battleship Yamato (1974), Heidi, Girl of the Alps (1974), Future Boy Conan (1978), Galaxy Express 999 (1978) and Mobile Suit Gundam (1979) during his junior and senior high school years, which Japanese anime fans of the time were crazy about.

Otomo had a strong influence on him, and his favorite works were Domu: A Child's Dream and AKIRA, especially Domu, which he liked so much that he said if he could make a movie out of only one manga he had ever read, it would be that one.
He was also influenced by the  movement in manga started by Otomo and others, and decided to not only read but also draw manga himself in his high school days. He was enlightened by the New Wave's way of overwhelmingly depicting a story in which nothing in particular happens, focusing on a character who could never be the protagonist of the story. Kon has also said that his drawing style has influenced by Otomo, as he used to work as Otomo's assistant when he was a manga artist. After entering the animation industry, he was greatly influenced by animators Hiroyuki Okiura, Toshiyuki Inoue, Takeshi Honda, Masashi Ando and art setter Takashi Watabe.

He had been watching only live-action films since he started college. He watched most of the movies on video and made it a routine to draw manga based on the setting, format and direction of the scenes. Ninety percent of the films he watched were made in the U.S., and he said that he learned a lot about his own style of visual expression from Hollywood films. However, he was not influenced by any particular film or director, but by everything he had ever seen. For example, Millennium Actress has scenes that borrow images from Kurosawa's Throne of Blood, Yasujiro Ozu's films, the hero of the chambara film Kurama Tengu, or the great Japanese star Godzilla. The film that directly influenced Millennium Actress is George Roy Hill's Slaughterhouse-Five (1972). When he was in college, it was not one film that influenced him the most, but the entire body of work of Terry Gilliam, including Time Bandits (1981), Brazil (1985) and The Adventures of Baron Munchausen (1989). However, the filmmaker whose works and books he had read the most is Akira Kurosawa.

As for novels, the works of Ryotaro Shiba, the Japanese historical novelist, had a great impact on Kon in terms of his own relationship with Japan. He was also very much inspired by Haruki Murakami, whose works have been translated into many foreign languages. He had seen the film Blade Runner (1982) before reading the novel and had not read all of his works, but Philip K. Dick was one of the authors he wanted to read and he became very interested in images of nightmares under his influence. He has been a long-time fan of Yasutaka Tsutsui since before he directed Paprika, and was especially influenced by reading Tsutsui's works intensively when he was around 20 years old. It was such a fundamental influence that even he did not know how or where Tsutsui's work influenced him. According to Kon, the appeal of Yasutaka Tsutsui's work is "deviation from common sense." What he learned from Tsutsui was "doubt the framework of common sense."

Legacy
Kon has had a great influence on many influential directors around the world even after his death. Many artists and works have been influenced by his realistic visual expression and vivid cutting, and his influence can be seen everywhere in the world. Kon's influence on foreign filmmakers has been more pronounced than in Japan, with live-action stalwarts such as Darren Aronofsky and Guillermo del Toro expressing their support.

American filmmaker Aronofsky was one of the directors greatly influenced by Kon, especially Perfect Blue. In an interview with Kon in 2001, he said that any scene in Requiem for a Dream that seems to be influenced by Perfect Blue is a homage to it, and that he still wants to make a live-action version of Perfect Blue. His 2010 film Black Swan was also pointed out by several critics for its similarity to Perfect Blue, but Aronofsky denied any direct influence.

Christopher Nolan's 2010 film Inception was also noted by several critics and scholars to have many striking similarities with Kon's Paprika (2006), including plot similarities, and similar scenes and characters.

Filmography

Film

Television

Bibliography

Manga

Other literary works

Accolades

References

Further reading 
 Andrew Osmond. Satoshi Kon: The Illusionist, Stone Bridge Press, 2009,

External links
 Personal website 
 
 
 
 Entry in The Encyclopedia of Science Fiction
 English translation of Satoshi Kon's last words
 Satoshi Kon - Editing Space & Time on Every Frame A Painting

Anime directors
Japanese film directors
Japanese animators
Japanese cartoonists
Anime screenwriters
Japanese storyboard artists
Madhouse (company) people
1963 births
2010 deaths
Deaths from cancer in Japan
Deaths from pancreatic cancer
Manga artists from Hokkaido
People from Sapporo
People from Kushiro, Hokkaido
Akira (franchise)